The Nepal national football team represents Nepal in International men's football, and is governed by the All Nepal Football Association (ANFA). A member of the Asian Football Confederation (AFC), the Nepali football team plays their home games at Dasharath Stadium in Kathmandu.

History

Origins (1921–1993)
Football in Nepal had been a national sport as early as 1921 during the Rana dynasty. Several clubs were formed and several domestic tournaments such as the Ram Janaki Cup (1934), and the Tribhuvan Challenge Shield (1948) were organized. In 1951, the All Nepal Football Association (ANFA) was founded, and this saw the formation of the Nepal national football team.

Emergence (1963–1970)
In 1963, Nepal appeared in their first international away game in the Aga Khan Gold Cup; the predecessor of the President's Gold Cup, Asia Champion Club Tournament, and Asian Club Championship (now rebranded as the AFC Champions League) after various associations (including ANFA) insisted on entering national teams instead of clubs. After Nepal entered an 18-man squad, ANFA flew the players to Dhaka, East Pakistan (now Bangladesh) to play their first match. Nepal faced Western Railway, a Pakistani team in the Bangabandhu National Stadium. However, the match was lost 0–7. Two days later, Nepal played the Dhaka Wanderers, a local East Pakistani team. Though this match was also lost 0–7. After two disastrous games, Nepal was sure to be knocked out of the preliminary round. The final game was against Dhaka Police Club, though, despite the previous heavy losses, Nepal managed to win the game with a single goal. The goal scorer, Prakash Bikram Shah, became the first Nepali to score on foreign soil. The goal took place at the 19th minute.

Modernisation & golden generation (1970–1999)
In 1970, Nepal became a member of FIFA. Two years later, Nepal joined the Asian Football Confederation (AFC). With this, Nepal played their first international match on 13 October 1972, where they lost 2–6 to the People's Republic of China. The first Nepali footballer to score the first international goal for Nepal in a FIFA-recognized tournament was Y.B Ghale. Ghale scored against Kuwait in the 1982 Asian Games. Despite the popularity of the game, the lack of appropriate footballing infrastructure and the dearth of trainers, technicians, and other facilities have always been obstacles in the way of the Nepali FA's endeavors to raise the standard of football among the players of a nation that has an official per capita income of just 1,196 US dollars. The woes of Nepali football, however, have been immensely relieved by FIFA's determination to promote football in Nepal through youth programs.

In the mid-1980s, FIFA provided financial assistance and sent a number of coaches to help Nepal's federation to launch its first youth program, which was geared towards spotting talent at the grassroots level (such as in schools, for example) and providing young players with the necessary know-how, both on and off the pitch. The initial five-year plan helped half the players groomed under the first youth program to find a place in the national side, and the team that won the 2 gold medals in the first and sixth South Asian Federation (SAF) Games mostly consisted of the players from that youth programme. Despite Nepal being considered among the lower-ranked nations, Nepal has been largely successful in the South Asian Games where they won two gold, two silver, and two bronze medals.

Nepal hosted several notable friendlies from teams outside the Asian Confederation during the mid to late 80s, against Denmark in 1986; USSR and East Germany in 1987; and West Germany in 1989.  While at the same time, Nepal still entered tournaments against club sides such as FC Ural Sverdlovsk Oblast in the 1989 ANFA Cup.

Nepal continued on with their winning ways through several minor tournaments which saw the nation showered with titles including the 1997 and 1998 Governor's Gold Cup, winning gold at the 1993 South Asian Games, and reaching 3rd place in the 1993 South Asian Association of Regional Co-operation Gold Cup (the first edition of the SAFF Championship).

Decline (2000–2009)

The Nepali football came across a forgettable two years from 2001 to 2003 when the row between two factions (government-backed and FIFA-backed) led Nepali football into deep trouble. Nepal faced a ban and therefore could not participate in any events and the rankings slipped heavily. The dispute was settled, but not before it contributed to pushing Nepali football backward. Nepal celebrated their 100th international football match in January 2003 when they played Bangladesh in the South Asian Football Federation (SAFF) Championship. Nepal failed to make any real impact at the tournament. During its 22 years of international participation, the Nepali team has only played 26 nations outside of South Asia, but it has defeated all of the country's South Asian neighbors during various regional tournaments. Nepal also faced non-AFC teams in competitive tournaments such as Ghana U23 in the 1999 Bangabandhu Cup, and Kazakhstan in the 2002 FIFA World Cup qualifying campaign (although Kazakhstan was a member of the AFC during this match).

Despite many attempts to raise the standard of football, the players of the resource-strapped nation have not been able to make their mark in international football beyond South Asia. In 2003 during the AFC Asian Cup qualifiers, Nepal's A national team suffered a number of heavy defeats in international matches outside of South Asia. In a match during the Asian Cup qualifying round in South Korea, the hosts scored 16 goals to no reply. In their six matches, Nepal conceded 45 goals and failed to hit the back of the net even once. However, the qualifying competition for the 2002 FIFA World Cup witnessed one of Nepal's best performances in international football, with the Gorkhalis securing two wins in four matches and scoring 13 goals in two matches against Macao and Iraq. But with the Nepali national and youth teams failing to achieve any noticeable success at the international level and FIFA introducing new age restriction systems in several international tournaments, Nepal recently decided to compete only in the FIFA World Cup and Asian Cup qualifiers as well as the SAFF Championship until 2006.

Resurgence (2010–present)
After the marquee appointments of Graham Roberts, Nepal had experienced a fair amount of success following the decade of decline. Nepal won Saff U-19 championship in 2015 and 3 major tournaments in 2016, the Bangabandhu Cup and the AFC Solidarity Cup and won a gold medal in 2016 South Asian Games. Nepal lost no match in 2016.

Nepal managed a well performance in the 2019 AFC Asian Cup qualification, although the team was luckily chosen as replacement for Guam as Guam chose not to participate. Nepal had two successful draws against much stronger Philippines and Yemen at home, both ended 0–0. However, as the team lost to Tajikistan twice and away loss to the Philippines and Yemen, the Nepalis failed to qualify to the 2019 AFC Asian Cup.

Nepal participated in the 2022 FIFA World Cup qualification where they have to face strong Australia, Kuwait and Jordan, alongside minnows Chinese Taipei. The Nepalis only managed one single win over Chinese Taipei away 2–0, and lost to the other opponents without scoring a goal after five matches.

Nepal participated in the 2021 SAFF Championship Managing to qualify from the group 2nd place behind India national football team. They fought but Nepal couldn't win against the Blue Tigers and lost by 3–0.

Home stadium

The team's home ground is various around the nation one of the ground being Dasarath Rangasala Stadium, a multi-purpose stadium in Kathmandu, Nepal. Holding 18,000 spectators all of which are beautifully seated. It is the biggest stadium in Nepal. It is named after Dashrath Chand, one of the martyrs of Nepal.

Most recently, the stadium was used as a primary venue for the 2012 AFC Challenge Cup and the 2013 SAFF Championship, with the Halchowk Stadium hosting some of the matches as well.

Apart from sporting events, the stadium is also used as a music venue for cultural events with Bryan Adams being the most notable act that performed at the site.

Before the 2013 SAFF Championship in Nepal, the stadium underwent a heavy renovation that saw several improvements such as the expansion of seats from 20,000 to 28,000.

The country also has some recenty added stadiums that include pokhara footbal stadium located at pokhara rangasala which has recently been consutucted on year 2021.

Team image

Kit evolution

The national team's kit employs a tricolor of red, blue, and white to reflect the colors of the national flag of Nepal. With red being used for home matches, and blue for away. The pattern in some kits reflects the triangular shaping of the flag, namely the 2013 kit. Nepal's kits are mostly template kits, as opposed to a custom team-specific kit. This is because the Nepal national team isn't lucrative enough to afford kit partnership deals with manufacturers.

Very little is known about the history prior to 1998. However, during the 1998 Asian Games in Bangkok, the Nepali national team hired Bijay Shah to provide technical assistance to the squad, while also acting as the assistant coach. At the time, the team didn't have printed sportswear for the tournament. After printing makeshift kits, Bijay was inspired to start a T-shirt printing company known as Attsh, where through the partnership with a US printing company, and colleagues in South Korea, they produced their first batch of kits for the national team prior to the 1999 South Asian Games.

On 4 March 2019, ANFA has revealed two new jerseys for members of the national football team along with new national football anthem. The new jerseys have ANFA logo on the left where used to be national flag in the old jerseys. There is also national flag and picture of Mount Everest above the ANFA logo. This new sign is designed by Sandeep Tiwari. ANFA also made provision of white jerseys for friendly matches.

In 2021, ANFA ended the contract with Kelme, the previous kit sponsor, and signed with KTM CTY.

Nepal Red & Blue

During the ANFA Cup, the All Nepal Football Association occasionally entered two teams for Nepal; Nepal Red & Nepal Blue. This is very much akin to other South Asian teams such as Pakistan (Pakistan Green & Pakistan White, 1993 SAFF Championship; Pakistan Reds, 1976 Quaid-e-Azam exhibition matches), and Bangladesh (Bangladesh Red, 1983 President's Gold Cup). Nepal Red was a selection of Nepali players that played as the full Nepal national football team. Whereas, Nepal Blue was effectively the B-team.

Most of the Nepali top players play in the Nepal Red team, and it is also described as "the Nepal senior team", and is captained by the regular national team captain. While Nepal Blue is described as the "second string team".

Results and fixtures

These are matches from the past 12 months, and future scheduled matches.

2022

2023

Coaching staff

Coaching history

Players

Current squad
 The following players were called up for the 2023 Three Nations Cup
 Caps and goals correct as of: 16 November 2022, after the match against

Recent call-ups
The following players have been called up to a Nepal squad in the last 12 months.

Notes
INJ = Withdrew due to injury.
PRE = Preliminary squad / standby.
RET = Retired from the national team.
SUS = Serving suspension.
WD = Player withdrew from the squad due to non-injury issue.

Player records

Players in bold are still active with Nepal.

Most appearances

Top goalscorers

Competitive record
*Denotes draws include knockout matches decided on penalty kicks.
**Red border color indicates tournament was held on home soil.

FIFA World Cup

AFC Asian Cup

AFC Challenge Cup

AFC Solidarity Cup

SAFF Championship

Olympic Games

Asian Games

South Asian Games

Other tournaments
In these tournaments, Nepal was sometimes fielded as 'ANFA XI', 'Nepal XI', or 'Nepal Sports Development Authority' despite being the de facto national football team endorsed by the ANFA.

**Former rules, win = 2pts.

Head-to-head record
Updated 17 November 2022 after match against

Honours

Continental
AFC Solidarity Cup 
Champions (1): 2016

Regional
South Asian Games
Champions (2): 1984, 1993
Runners-up (2): 1987, 1999
Third place (1): 1985
SAFF Championship
Runners-up (1): 2021
Third place (1): 1993

Invitational
ANFA Cup
Champions (1): 1987
Bangabandhu Cup 
Champions (1): 2016 
Three Nations Cup
Champions (1): 2021

See also

All Nepal Football Association
Nepal national football team (2010–present)
Nepal national under-23 football team
Nepal national under-20 football team
Nepal national under-17 football team
Nepal women's national football team

Notes

References

External links 
 Nepali football tournaments details - Nepal90
 Nepal FIFA profile
 Nepal national football team picture 
 Nepali Football Team, Fixtures and Results

 
Football in Nepal
Asian national association football teams
1951 establishments in Nepal
F